The California High School Speech Association, or CHSSA, is a speech and debate organization offered to all schools in the state of California. It is the governing body for local and state speech and debate competitions in California, with higher-level competition under the auspices of the National Forensic League and the National Catholic Forensic League. The league held its first championship tournament in 1958, and continues to hold championship tournaments every April.

Events

The California High School Speech Association offers the following events (bold denotes events that are recognized by the National Forensic League):

Debate
 Policy Debate (TM)
 Lincoln-Douglas Debate (LD)
 Public Forum Debate (PF)
 Congressional Debate (CONG)
 Parliamentary Debate (PRL)

Speech

Original Events
 Original Oratory (OO)
 Original Prose & Poetry (OPP)
 Informative Speaking (INFO)

Interpretation Events
 Duo Interpretation (DUO)
 Dramatic Interpretation (DI)
 Humorous Interpretation (HI)
 Thematic Interpretation (TI)

Spontaneous Events
 International Extemporaneous (IX)
 National Extemporaneous (NX)
 Impromptu (IMP)

CHSSA Leagues
CHSSA divides the state of California into four areas and eleven leagues of competition, based on region. Any school can become a member of CHSSA, and its ability to compete in league tournaments is determined by school location.

Area 1
Golden Gate Speech Association (GGSA) - includes the counties of Alameda, Contra Costa, Del Norte, Humboldt, Lake, Marin, Mendocino, Napa, San Francisco, Siskiyou, Solano, Sonoma and Trinity.
Coast Forensic League (CFL) - includes the counties of Monterey, San Benito, San Mateo, Santa Clara, and Santa Cruz.

Area 2
Capitol Valley Forensics League (CVFL) - includes the counties of Butte, Colusa, El Dorado, Glenn, Lassen, Modoc, Nevada, Placer, Plumas, Sacramento, Shasta, Sierra, Tehama, Yolo, and Yuba
Southern Valley Forensics League (SVFL) - includes the counties of Fresno, Inyo, Kern, Kings, Madera, and Tulare
Yosemite Forensics League (YFL) - includes the counties of Alpine, Amador, Calaveras, El Dorado, Mariposa, Merced, San Joaquin, Solano, Stanislaus, and Tuolumne

Area 3
Tri-County Forensics League (TCFL) - includes the counties of Los Angeles (partial), San Luis Obispo, Santa Barbara, and Ventura.
Southern California Debate League (SCDL) - includes the county of Los Angeles (east)
Western Bay Forensics League (WBFL) - includes the county of Los Angeles (west)

Area 4
Orange County Speech League (OCSL) – includes the county of Orange
Citrus Belt Speech Region (CBSR) – includes the counties of Kern (partial), Riverside, and San Bernardino
San Diego Imperial Valley Speech League (SDIVSL) – includes the counties of San Diego and Imperial

See also 

 Competitive debate in the United States

References

External links

 California High School Speech Association Official Website
 National Forensic League Official Website
 Point of Information: Central Website for High School Parliamentary Debate

Student debating societies
Organizations based in California